Italo Mari (born 13 February 1939) is an Italian sports shooter. He competed in the mixed 50 metre running target event at the 1980 Summer Olympics.

References

External links
 

1939 births
Living people
Italian male sport shooters
Olympic shooters of Italy
Shooters at the 1980 Summer Olympics
Sportspeople from the Province of Cremona